Bill Johnstone (9 March 1919 – 4 April 1976) was an Australian rules footballer who played with Collingwood in the Victorian Football League (VFL).

Notes

External links 

Profile on Collingwood Forever

1919 births
1976 deaths
VFL/AFL players born outside Australia
Australian rules footballers from Victoria (Australia)
Collingwood Football Club players